The Canadian Biodiversity Strategy has been prepared in response to Canada's obligations as a party to the United Nations Convention on Biological Diversity.  The Strategy has been developed as a guide to the implementation of the Biodiversity Convention in Canada. 

Recognition of the worldwide impact of the decline of biodiversity inspired the global community to negotiate the United Nations Convention on Biological Diversity. The Canadian delegation participated in the negotiations, the Prime Minister signed the Convention at the Earth Summit in June 1992 and, in December 1992, Canada ratified it.  Prior ratifying parties included Mauritius, Maldives, and Monaco.

One of the key obligations for parties that have ratified the Convention is to prepare a national strategy.

Elements of the Strategy

The Strategy contains guiding principles supporting a vision of society that lives sustainably, and contains a framework for action to support sustainable development as part of international efforts to implement the Convention on Biological Diversity.  The Strategy goals are related to conservation, education, support, and collaboration.

In 2015, Canada adopted 19 targets to fulfill its obligations under the treaty. The first was to conserve at least 17% of terrestrial area and inland water, and 10% of coastal and marine areas, through "networks of protected areas and other effective area-based conservation measures." By the end of 2019, Canada was not on track to meeting its first target, having only conserved 12.1% of its terrestrial area (land and freshwater).

Criticism of the Strategy

Although biodiversity exists at many levels, from genetics to communities to ecosystems, and varies depending on type and organization, most conservation plans - the Canadian Biodiversity Strategy included - tend to focus on tangible, easily measured, visible aspects of biodiversity: species.

See also
Biodiversity
Convention on Biological Diversity
Canada's Biodiversity Convention Office
Canadian Biodiversity Information Network
Biodiversity Outcomes Framework
Criticisms of the biodiversity paradigm

References

External links
Convention on Biological Diversity
Biodiversity Convention Office
Environment Canada

Environment of Canada
Environment and Climate Change Canada
Convention on Biological Diversity